This is the list of winners of the Nandi Award for Best Feature Films since 1964.

Best Feature Film - Gold

Second Best Feature Film - Silver

Third Best Feature Film - Bronze

References

See also
 Cinema of Andhra Pradesh

Feature Film
Awards for best film